The Cree Nation of Nemaska is a Cree First Nation of Quebec, Canada. It is headquartered at the Cree village of Nemaska and also has a terre réservée crie of the same name, both located in the Eeyou Istchee territory in Northern Quebec. In 2016, it has a registered population of 781 members. The nation is in negotiation with the government of Canada to obtain its self-governance.

References

External links
 Official website
 First Nation Detail by Indigenous and Northern Affairs Canada

Cree governments
First Nations governments in Quebec